Type U 31 was a class of U-boats built during World War I by the Kaiserliche Marine.

Later admiral and head of the Abwehr from 1935 to 1944 Wilhelm Canaris also served as commander on two different Type U 31 U-boats.

Design
German Type U 31 submarines were double-hulled ocean-going submarines similar to Type 23 and Type 27 subs in dimensions and differed only slightly in propulsion and speed. They were considered very good high sea boats with average manoeuvrability and good surface steering.

The U-boats were armed with four  torpedo tubes, two fitted in the bow and two in the stern, and carried 6 torpedoes. Most boats received one or two  SK L/30 deck guns, which were later replaced with  SK L/45 guns on some. The boats' complement was 4 officers and 31 enlisted.

List of Type U 31 submarines 
There were eleven Type U 31 submarines commissioned into the Kaiserliche Marine.

See also

References

Bibliography

External links
 

Submarine classes
 
World War I submarines of Germany